Terry Amoah, popularly known as DJ Shiwaawa, is a Ghanaian disc jockey. He won the Artiste DJ of the year in the 2018 edition of the Ghana DJ Awards while working with late Ebony.

Career 
DJ Shiwaawa started his career as a DJ in his mother's bar, Sweet City, in Nyakrom. He worked with Ruff Town Records whereby he was the personal DJ of late Ebony Reigns. He was also contract by VVIP to work with them on various projects alongside djing. As result of good working relation when it comes to djing, he has been able to work with key media houses like 4syte TV, Viasat 1 Television and Kwese Sports Television

Awards 

 Artist DJ of the Year

References 

Ghanaian DJs
Living people
Year of birth missing (living people)